The 2023 Vero Beach International Tennis Open was a professional tennis tournament played on outdoor clay courts. It was part of the 2023 ITF Women's World Tennis Tour. It took place in Vero Beach, United States between 16 and 22 January 2023.

Singles main draw entrants

Seeds 

 1 Rankings as of 9 January 2023.

Champions

Singles

 Marie Benoît def.  Emma Navarro 6–2, 7–5

Doubles

 Francesca Di Lorenzo /  Makenna Jones def.  Quinn Gleason /  Elixane Lechemia 6–3, 3–6, [10–6]

References

2023 ITF Women's World Tennis Tour
2023 in American tennis
January 2023 sports events in the United States